Connor Hallisey  (born February 9, 1993) is a former American soccer player who last played for Sporting Kansas City in Major League Soccer.

Career

College and Amateur
Hallisey spent all four years of his college career at the University of California, where he was a MAC Hermann Trophy semifinalist after contributing nine goals and 12 assists as a senior in 2014. He also earned NSCAA Second Team All-American and All-Pac-12 First Team honors.

Professional
On January 15, 2015, Hallisey was drafted 10th overall in the 2015 MLS SuperDraft by Sporting Kansas City. Hallisey made his professional debut for the club on April 25, 2015 as an injury time substitute during a 4-4 draw with Houston Dynamo.

References

External links

California Golden Bears bio

1993 births
Living people
American soccer players
Association football midfielders
California Golden Bears men's soccer players
Major League Soccer players
People from Granite Bay, California
Soccer players from California
Sporting Kansas City draft picks
Sporting Kansas City players
Sportspeople from Greater Sacramento
Sporting Kansas City II players
United States men's youth international soccer players
USL Championship players